"Last night" is a song by Australian singer-songwriter Graace. It was released on 6 September 2018 as the second single from Graace's debut extended play Self Sabotage (2018). The song was certified gold in Australia in July 2019.

Background
Graace said the song was written at a point when she realised her self-sabotaging nature: "I was in the studio with Xavier and we had both recently gotten out of toxic relationships. We came to the conclusion we weren't happy within ourselves and that's what caused these relationships to fail. We weren't accepting the good things that came our way because we didn't think we deserved the love."

Music video
The music video was directed by Sejon Im and released on 3 October 2018.

Critical reception
AIRIT said "'Last Night' features breathy sultry vocal anchored by anthemic piano chords and alt pop production."

Max Lewis from Purple Sneakers said "Simple piano chords and isolated vocals give way to a gorgeously packed chorus with layered vocals and quiet synths. The track flows between downtrodden verses and uplifting choruses, as though the narrator is coming to some sort of realisation after a long time of struggling."

Track listings

Certifications

Release history

References

2018 singles
2018 songs
Graace songs